The 2020–21 Western Michigan Broncos men's ice hockey season was the 47th season of play for the program and the 8th in the NCHC conference. The Broncos represented Western Michigan University and were coached by Andy Murray, in his 10th season.

Season
As a result of the ongoing COVID-19 pandemic the entire college ice hockey season was delayed. Because the NCAA had previously announced that all winter sports athletes would retain whatever eligibility they possessed through at least the following year, none of Western Michigan's players would lose a season of play. However, the NCAA also approved a change in its transfer regulations that would allow players to transfer and play immediately rather than having to sit out a season, as the rules previously required.

Western Michigan began the season playing a series of games in Omaha, Nebraska, along with the rest of the NCHC. Before the team could even finish its first game, the Broncos were hamstrung by an injury to their starting netminder, Brandon Bussi. The team turned to senior Austin Cain and, after a very rough start, he settled into the starting role. Cain played well at times but the team's compact schedule of games gave WMU few favors and by Christmas the team sat near the bottom of the conference with a 2–6–2 record. After getting swept by Miami at the beginning of January, freshman Alex Aslanidis was put in net and the team began to show signs of life. After nearly returning the favor to Miami, the Broncos swept #4 St. Cloud State and turned their season around virtually overnight. Aslanidis' performance, paired with the stellar play of Ronnie Attard, allowed Western Michigan to sweep another #4 team a few weeks later (Minnesota Duluth). In their final weekend of the regular season Bussi returned from his injury and swept Miami to put the team within one game of a .500 record.

Despite the teams vastly improved performance in the second half of the season, their record meant that the team had no real chance of making the NCAA Tournament without winning the NCHC Championship. The team had to get through Minnesota Duluth in the quarterfinals and the Broncos gave everything they had, taking a lead into the third period and then tying the game with less than a minute to play. WMU nearly matched UMD shot-for-shot but the final goal came from the Bulldogs and Western Michigan's season was over.

Jacob Bauer, Rhett Kingston and Jared Kucharek sat out the season.

Departures

Recruiting

Roster
As of March 1, 2021.

Standings

Schedule and Results

|-
!colspan=12 style="color:white; background:#6C4023; " | Regular Season

|-
!colspan=12 style="color:white; background:#6C4023; " |

Scoring statistics

Goaltending statistics

Rankings

USCHO did not release a poll in week 20.

Awards and honors

References

Western Michigan Broncos men's ice hockey seasons
Western Michigan Broncos
Western Michigan Broncos
Western Michigan Broncos
Western Michigan Broncos
Western Michigan Broncos